Richard Henry is a pseudonym credited on collaborative works of authors Richard Butler and Henry Chance Newton.

Works attributed to Richard Henry include Monte Cristo Jr. (1886) and Frankenstein, or The Vampire's Victim, a parody of the Mary Shelley novel Frankenstein, presented at the Gaiety Theatre, London in 1887.

Selected works
Monte Cristo Jr. -  (burlesque melodrama 1886)
Jubilation -  (musical mixture 1887)
Frankenstein, or The Vampire's Victim - (burlesque 1887)
Opposition - (a debate in one sitting 1892)

References

Collective pseudonyms